Federal Standard 1037C, titled Telecommunications: Glossary of Telecommunication Terms, is a United States Federal Standard issued by the General Services Administration pursuant to the Federal Property and Administrative Services Act of 1949, as amended.

This document provides federal departments and agencies a comprehensive source of definitions of terms used in telecommunications and directly related fields by international and U.S. government telecommunications specialists.

As a publication of the U.S. government, prepared by an agency of the U.S. government, it appears to be mostly available as a public domain resource, but a few items are derived from copyrighted sources: where this is the case, there is an attribution to the source.

This standard was superseded in 2001 by American National Standard T1.523-2001, Telecom Glossary 2000, which is published by  ATIS. The old standard is still frequently used, because the new standard is protected by copyright, as usual for ANSI standards.

A newer proposed standard is the "ATIS Telecom Glossary 2011", ATIS-0100523.2011.

See also

 Automatic message exchange
 Bilateral synchronization
 Decrypt
 List of telecommunications encryption terms
 List of telecommunications terminology
 Net operation
 Online and offline

References

External links
 ATIS Telecom Glossary 2000 T1.523-2001  (successor)

 Download of the standard
 Development Site for proposed Revisions to American National Standard T1.523-2001
 

 
Glossaries
Publications of the United States government
Reference works in the public domain
Telecommunications standards